Hagnon of Peparethus was an ancient Greek athlete listed by Eusebius of Caesarea as a victor in the stadion race of the 53rd Olympiad (568 BC). He was the first winner from the Aegean Islands and the only winner from the Sporades.

References

See also 
 Olympic winners of the Stadion race

Ancient Olympic competitors
6th-century BC Greek people
People from Skopelos